Lessard-et-le-Chêne is a commune in the Calvados department in the Normandy region in northwestern France.

Population

See also
Communes of the Calvados department

References

Lessardetlechene
Calvados communes articles needing translation from French Wikipedia